Stitch! The Movie is a 2003 American animated science fiction comedy film produced by Walt Disney Television Animation and Rough Draft Korea, released on August 26, 2003. It is the second film released in the Lilo & Stitch franchise and the third film chronologically, taking place after the 2002 first film and (by later extension) the 2005 direct-to-video sequel Lilo & Stitch 2: Stitch Has a Glitch. The film also serves as the backdoor pilot of the spin-off sequel series Lilo & Stitch: The Series, which debuted the following month. The story is an introduction to Dr. Jumba Jookiba's 625 experiments (made prior to Stitch) that he created with the financing of Dr. Jacques von Hämsterviel.

Plot 
Stitch is still not fitting in and causes another disaster. Lilo tries to encourage him by saying he's one-of-a-kind, comparing him to Frankenstein's monster, which just makes him feel worse. Meanwhile, ex-captain Gantu, who's in his new spaceship after his original one got destroyed when he kidnapped Lilo and tried to recapture Stitch, is hired by Jumba's former partner; a diminutive creature resembling a cross between a hamster, poodle and rabbit named Dr. Jacques von Hämsterviel to retrieve the other 625 experiments. Gantu goes to Earth, breaking into Lilo and Stitch's home, blasting Stitch into a net, finding and taking a blue pod with the number 625 on it, and abducting Jumba for interrogation. Stitch and Lilo take Jumba's spaceship and chase Gantu into outer space, engaging him in battle, only to be defeated and fall back towards Earth.

Back at their house, Lilo, Stitch and Pleakley find the container Jumba was hiding. Pleakley realizes that these are the other 625 experiments, in dehydrated form, and warns them not to tell anyone or put the experiments in water, aware of how dangerous they are. Deliberately disobeying Pleakley's orders, Stitch and Lilo retrieve the container and hydrate one of the experiments, Experiment 221, who promptly escapes into the night. Jumba is being held captive on the ship of Dr. Hämsterviel. Unable to intimidate Jumba, Hämsterviel activates another experiment, Experiment 625, to attack him. Although 625 has all of Stitch's powers, he is incredibly lazy and a terrible coward, prioritizing making sandwiches above all else. Meanwhile, Pleakley is able to call Hämsterviel's ship via telephone. Hämsterviel tells Pleakley that he wants a ransom of the other 624 experiments in return for Jumba. When Pleakley informs the other family members what the ransom is, Nani proceeds to call Cobra Bubbles about the problem while Lilo and Stitch go out to find 221. When Cobra arrives the next morning, he seems to already know about what happened. Meanwhile, Stitch and Lilo finally manage to catch a troublesome Experiment 221 at a nearby hotel with a glass vase and soon befriend him.

The rendezvous time arrives and Pleakley and Cobra show up with the container, not knowing that it contains only 623 experiments. Pleakley hands the container over to Hämsterviel, who is shocked to find that one is missing. Lilo then shows up with Experiment 221 trapped in the vase. Announcing that she has named it "Sparky", she says that Sparky is part of Stitch's, and thus her, ohana. Furious, Hämsterviel tells her to give him the experiment or Jumba will die. After several moments of thinking and hearing Cobra, Pleakley, Jumba and Hämsterviel persuading them, Lilo and Stitch set Sparky free and break Jumba from his bonds. On Cobra's signal, the Grand Councilwoman's ship rises out of the nearby ocean and aims several guns at Hämsterviel to obliterate him. Lilo protests, saying that Hämsterviel has the other experiments while Sparky overhears this. Sparky then proceeds to use his electrical abilities to blow the power on the Councilwoman's ship, while Hämsterviel and Gantu climb back aboard their own ship with the captured experiments. In a last attempt to stop Hämsterviel, Lilo, Stitch and Sparky stow away on it as it leaves Earth.

Inside the ship, Lilo and Stitch manage to swipe the container with the other experiments in it. The struggle for the container between Lilo, Stitch and Gantu results in releasing the dehydrated pods to rain down and scatter throughout Hawaii. Having captured the two, Hämsterviel reveals his plans to clone Stitch a thousand times over and orders Gantu to do what he wants with Lilo. While Gantu puts Lilo in a teleportation pod to send her to an intergalactic zoo, Stitch is strapped to a weight just heavier than he can lift. Watching as Stitch tries to avoid being vivisected by a laser for the cloning process, Sparky shows that he has reformed by short-circuiting the cloning machine. He then breaks Stitch free from his bonds and the two strap Hämsterviel to the device before they rescue Lilo.

Having locked Hämsterviel in handcuffs, Lilo, Stitch, and Sparky short-circuit Gantu's ship, causing it to crash near a waterfall on Kauai. Landing Hämsterviel's ship back at the rendezvous point, they give Sparky a new home powering Kīlauea Lighthouse, which hasn't been running in years because powering it was very expensive. They then persuade the Grand Councilwoman to let them rehabilitate the other 623 experiments. The Councilwoman places Hämsterviel under arrest, and Jumba whispers to Pleakley that he has plans for making Experiment 627. At that moment, Experiments 202, 529, 455, 489, and 390 are activated, beginning the events of the series.

Later, Jumba and Pleakley hope to go home with the Grand Councilwoman this time, but they are left stranded on Earth once again.

Voice cast
 Chris Sanders as Stitch a.k.a. Experiment 626
 Frank Welker as Sparky a.k.a. Experiment 221, Stitch's cousin and Various Voices
 Daveigh Chase as Lilo Pelekai
 Jeff Bennett as Dr. Hämsterviel
 Kevin Michael Richardson as Captain Gantu
 Tia Carrere as Nani Pelekai
 David Ogden Stiers as Dr. Jumba Jookiba
 Kevin McDonald as Agent Wendy Pleakley
 Ving Rhames as Cobra Bubbles
 Rob Paulsen as Reuben a.k.a. Experiment 625, Gantu's sidekick
 Dee Bradley Baker as David Kawena

Other voices, listed as "With the Voice Talents of":
 Corey Burton as Hawaiian Man
 Zoe Caldwell as Grand Councilwoman
 Tress MacNeille as Hämsterviel's Ship Computer
 Kunewa Mook as Moses Puloki
 Liliana Mumy as Mertle Edmonds
 Jess Winfield as Various Voices
 Lili Ishida as Yuki (uncredited)
 Jillian Henry as Elena (uncredited)
 Kali Whitehurst as Teresa (uncredited)

Production
Presented by Walt Disney Pictures and produced by Walt Disney Television Animation, Stitch! The Movie is the lead-in to Lilo & Stitch: The Series.

At some point, there was a decision to only have Stitch's name in the titles of both the film and the subsequent series, which was planned to be called Stitch! The TV Series. Eventually, this was abolished, resulting in both this film and The Series having mismatched names. The Stitch! name (with exclamation point) was used as the title for an anime series five years after this film's release.

Critical reception

In a 2019 list of direct-to-video sequels, prequels, and "mid-quels" to Disney animated films, Petrana Radulovic of Polygon ranked Stitch! The Movie tenth out of twenty-six films, the lowest of the Lilo & Stitch sequel films on her list. Radulovic wrote that she liked the message of Stitch finding his family, but criticized it for not being as funny as the original Lilo & Stitch film, stating that "some of the [mundane] charm of Lilo & Stitch[...]is lost in favor of chasing a new alien [Sparky] and introducing the rabbitlike villain [Hämsterviel] who just wants world domination."

In a similar list in 2020, Lisa Wehrstedt of Insider ranked Stitch! The Movie seventeenth out of twenty-five films, also the lowest of the Lilo & Stitch sequels on her list. Wehrstedt wrote that she believed the film's premise did not warrant a full feature film, and its finale was too "open-ended" to have Stitch! The Movie "work as a stand-alone film like the rest of the Lilo & Stitch sequels." However, she nonetheless claimed that "everything in the Lilo & Stitch world has an irresistible charm that propels it up many ranks considering what its plot and animation quality would be able to achieve without a bunch of cute little monsters."

Notes

References

External links

 
 

2003 films
2003 animated films
2003 direct-to-video films
2000s American animated films
American children's animated comic science fiction films
American sequel films
American television series premieres
Direct-to-video sequel films
Disney direct-to-video animated films
Animated films about children
Films set in Hawaii
Lilo & Stitch (franchise)
Television films as pilots
Films scored by Michael Tavera
Films scored by Alan Silvestri
Rough Draft Studios films
Disney Television Animation films
2000s children's animated films
Films directed by Bobs Gannaway
Films directed by Tony Craig (director)
2000s English-language films
Animated films about revenge